Cheung Kong (Holdings) Limited, is a multinational conglomerate, based in Hong Kong. It was one of Hong Kong's leading multi-national conglomerates. The company merged with its subsidiary Hutchison Whampoa on 3 June 2015, as part of a major reorganisation, to become part of CK Hutchison Holdings.

The Chairman of Cheung Kong Holdings was Li Ka Shing (李嘉誠), while his elder son, Victor Li (李澤鉅), was Managing Director and Deputy Chairman. Li Ka Shing founded Cheung Kong Industries in 1950s as a plastics manufacturer. Under his leadership, the company grew rapidly and eventually evolved into a property investment company. "Cheung Kong (Holdings) Limited" was established in 1971.

The Cheung Kong Group is one of the largest developers of residential, office, retail, industrial and hotel properties in Hong Kong. With its history of property development and residential estates, As part of the reorganisation of the group, a new company composed of the group's property assets was spun-off in June 2015 as Cheung Kong Property Holdings.

Component companies

The market capitalisation of the Cheung Kong Group's Hong Kong listed companies amounted to HK$1,148 billion on 31 January 2015. The Group operated in over 50 countries and employs over 240,000 staff worldwide.

The Group had nine companies.
Hutchison Whampoa Limited (和記黃埔有限公司) 
Cheung Kong Infrastructure Holdings Limited (長江基建集團有限公司) 
Power Assets Holdings Limited (香港電燈集團有限公司) 
CK Life Sciences Int'l., (Holdings) Inc. (長江生命科技集團有限公司) .
Hutchison Asia Telecommunications Limited (和記電訊國際有限公司)
TOM Group Limited (TOM集團有限公司) 
The company was first listed on the Hong Kong Stock Exchange in 1972 as Cheung Kong Holdings, and developed into a property development and strategic investment company, with substantial interests in life sciences and other businesses.

Cheung Kong Group became one of the largest developers in Hong Kong with a long history of property development. About one in twelve of the private residences in Hong Kong were developed by the company.

The company and Sun Hung Kai Properties together became increasingly dominant in the development of new private homes, accounting for 70% of the market in 2010, up from around half of that in 2003. This concentration, with much of the rest of the market occupied by other very large firms, is attributed to the government's policy of auctioning land in expensively large blocks, squeezing out small and mid-sized firms, according to the Consumer Council.

Its board of directors included Wong Yuchin, Victor Li Tzar-kuoi, elder son of Li Ka-shing, Canning Fok, Simon Murray, and was chaired by Li senior.

Restructuring
In January 2015, Li Ka Shing confirmed the business would be restructured and its property business spun-off as a separately listed company, Cheung Kong Property. Under the plans, Cheung Kong Holdings purchased the shares in Hutchison Whampoa that it did not already own, and merged the companies under a new single holding company, CK Hutchison Holdings. The new holding company was established on 18 March 2015, based in the Cayman Islands, but listed in Hong Kong.

Hutchison Whampoa was delisted on 3 June 2015, on the same day that a new company comprising the group's existing property assets, Cheung Kong Property Holdings, began trading.

Shareholdings

Telecommunications

The company operates mobile telephone services under the 3 brand in 10 countries, inherited from Hutchison Whampoa.

CK Hutchison's telecommunications subsidiaries in Hong Kong and Australia are listed companies; the company holds 66.09% and 87.87% stakes in these respectively.

Cheung Kong Infrastructure Holdings Ltd

The Chairman of Cheung Kong Infrastructure Holdings Limited (CKI) is Victor Li Tzar Kuoi.  CKI is the largest diversified infrastructure company listed on the Hong Kong Stock Exchange. It is a Hong Kong-based diversified infrastructure company, focused on the development, investment and operation of infrastructure businesses in many countries such as China, Australia, and the United Kingdom.

CK Hutchison holds a 75.67% stake in the company.

Power Assets Holdings Limited

The Chairman of Power Assets Holdings Limited is Canning Fok Kin-ning. The listed Hongkong Electric group of companies are
The Hongkong Electric Company Limited (HEC),
Hongkong Electric International Limited (HEI),
Associated Technical Services Limited (ATS); and
some minor subsidiaries.
The Hongkong Electric Company Limited mainly concentrates on generation and supply of electricity on Hong Kong Island and Lamma Island. Hongkong Electric International Limited pursues overseas investment opportunities and Associated Technical Services Limited's principal activity is engineering consultancy and project management.

CK Hutchison holds a 38.87% stake in the company.

CK Life Sciences Int'l., (Holdings) Inc.

CK Life Sciences is engaged in the business of research and development, commercialisation, marketing and sale of biotechnology products. Products developed by CK Life Sciences are categorised into two areas:
 Human health; and
 Environmental sustainability.

CK Hutchison holds a 45.32% stake in the company.

Other investments
Apart from the core business of property development, CK Hutchison' ventures include TOM Group Limited.  Ltd,  Corporation Limited, CK Communications Ltd, Excel Technology International Holdings Ltd,  Corporation (HK) Ltd and Beijing Net-Infinity Technology Development Co., Ltd.

Hutchison Whampoa's 34% stake in the Canadian energy company Husky Energy passed to CK Hutchison on completion of the merger.

See also
List of Chinese companies
3G

References

External links

Predecessors of CK Hutchison Holdings
Land developers of Hong Kong
Conglomerate companies of Hong Kong
Multinational companies headquartered in Hong Kong
1950 establishments in Hong Kong
2015 mergers and acquisitions